WNJH (105.5 MHz) is a non-commercial educational FM radio station licensed to Cape May Court House, New Jersey. The station is owned by The Bridge of Hope, Inc. and it simulcasts the Christian adult contemporary radio format of sister station 88.7 WKNZ Harrington. The studios and offices are in Milford, Delaware.

WNJH has an effective radiated power (ERP) of 3,300 watts. The transmitter is on Court House South Dennis Road in Middle Township, New Jersey.

History
On September 5, 1985, the station originally signed on the air as WBNJ. WBNJ was an adult contemporary station that by 1989 had evolved into a new age music station marketed as "Joy 105.5."

In 1992, WBNJ tried flipping to several other formats, including a middle of the road (MOR) format for a few months, followed by a country music format branded as "Hit Country 105." When neither of these caught on, WBNJ began simulcasting an urban adult contemporary station, 96.1 WTTH The Touch, based in Margate. In 1995, the station was acquired by Margate Communications for $495,000.

In February 1999, WBNJ changed its call sign to WZBZ and flipped to a Rhythmic Adult Contemporary station as "The Buzz 105.5." Don Brooks, owner and general manager, hired Ted Noah in January 1999 to launch the radio station in its new dance format. It was Noah's first official full-time on air position and programming job at 19 years old. Noah programmed and directed The Buzz musically and was also the afternoon announcer for the first three years. The station operated in Atlantic City right in front of The Tropicana Casino. Its signal reached the broadcast facilities, even though its broadcast tower served the extreme southern end of the Atlantic City/Cape May market, mainly covering Cape May, Southern and Western Atlantic and Eastern Cumberland Counties its first year.

In 2000, WBNJ began simulcasting sister station 99.3 WSAX. While keeping the Buzz name, it switched formats to Rhythmic Contemporary Hits. 105.5's call letters, WZBZ, moved to 99.3; 105.5 became WGBZ. 99.3 became the originating station while 105.5 was now the simulcast frequency.

In 2002, WGBZ, along with all its sister stations WZBZ, WMID and WMID-FM, were purchased by the competition, Equity Communications, L.P., owner of then-rival CHR station WAYV.

In 2007, WGBZ's call letters were changed to WSNQ.

In 2008, The Buzz became 99.3 Kiss FM and began playing more of a CHR format. WSNQ continued to broadcast a simulcast of WZBZ.

On December 15, 2011, at 7 p.m., the station flipped its simulcast of sister station of WZBZ for a classic hits format, under the name "Sunny 105.5."

On August 26, 2013, WSNQ swapped formats and call signs with sister station WAIV.

Effective February 12, 2021, Equity Communications sold WAIV to The Bridge of Hope, Inc. for $65,000. On March 12, 2021, 105.5 returned to the air, stunting with family-friendly stand-up comedy ahead of their future format launch. The station began simulcasting on Tuesday, March 16 at 8am.

References

External links
 WNJH official website

NJH
Radio stations established in 1985
1985 establishments in New Jersey
Cape May County, New Jersey
Contemporary Christian radio stations in the United States